Dana Trivigno (born January 7, 1994) is an American women's ice hockey player with the Premier Hockey Federation and the American national team.

Playing career 
Prior to competing with Boston College, Trivigno attended Shattuck St. Mary's in Faribault, Minnesota. She served as Boston captain in her final season with the university. She graduated as the sixth highest scorer in the university's history.

In the 2015 NWHL Draft, she was selected by the New York Riveters, but chose to sign with the Connecticut Whale instead. She was named to Team Kessel for the 2017 NWHL All-Star Game. After one year with the Whale, she signed for the Boston Pride. She consistently ranked as one of the top players for face-off percentage in her 3 years in the NWHL.

In May 2019, she joined the PWHPA boycott of the 2019–20 season.

In March 2022, she departed the PWHPA and signed with Buffalo of the Premier Hockey Federation (PHF) for the remainder of the 2021-2022 season.

International 

She was named to the roster of the United States national women's ice hockey team that competed at the 2015 IIHF Women's World Championship.

Personal life 

Trivigno has served as a referee for Hockey East. She has a degree in finance. Her brother Bobby plays for the University of Massachusetts.

Career statistics

References

1994 births
Living people
American women's ice hockey forwards
Boston College Eagles women's ice hockey players
Connecticut Whale (PHF) players
Boston Pride players